Speyrah may refer to:
Spera, Khost Province, Afghanistan
Speyrah, Paktia, Afghanistan